Shahrabad Rural District is a rural district (dehestan) in Shahrabad District, Bardaskan County, Razavi Khorasan Province, Iran. At the 2006 census, its population (including Shahrabad, which was subsequently detached from the rural district when it was elevated to city status) was 10,800, in 2,692 families; excluding Shahrabad, its population at the 2006 census was 8,615, in 2,169 families.  The rural district has 12 villages.

References 

Rural Districts of Razavi Khorasan Province
Bardaskan County
Rural Districts of Bardaskan County